The 1983 Seiko Super Tennis Wailea, also known as the Hawaii Open, was a men's tennis tournament played an outdoor hard courts in Maui, Hawaii, in the United States that was part of the 1983 Volvo Grand Prix circuit. It was the tenth edition of the tournament and was held from September 26 through October 2, 1983. Third-seeded Scott Davis won the singles title.

Finals

Singles
 Scott Davis defeated  Vince Van Patten 6–3, 6–7, 7–6.
 It was Davis's first singles title of his career.

Doubles
 Steve Meister /  Tony Giammalva defeated  Mike Bauer /  Scott Davis 6–3, 5–7, 6–4

See also
 1983 Ginny Championships – women's tournament

References

Seiko Super Tennis Wailea
Seiko Super Tennis Wailea
Seiko Super Tennis Wailea
Seiko Super Tennis Wailea
Seiko Super Tennis Wailea
Hawaii Open